His Day Out is a surviving 1918 American silent comedy film featuring Oliver Hardy.

Cast
 Billy West as Billy
 Leatrice Joy as Joy
 Oliver Hardy as Oliver
 Leo White
 Joe Bordeaux
 Ethel Marie Burton
 Bud Ross as The Father (as Budd Ross)
 Slim Cole
 Don Likes as A Customer
 Billy Quirk

See also
 List of American films of 1918
 Oliver Hardy filmography

References

External links

1918 films
1918 short films
1918 comedy films
American silent short films
Silent American comedy films
American black-and-white films
Films directed by Arvid E. Gillstrom
American comedy short films
1910s American films